"The Sniper" is the 34th episode of the M*A*S*H television series, and tenth of season two. The episode aired on November 17, 1973.

Plot
Hawkeye's picnic date with new nurse Lieutenant Marquette (Teri Garr) is interrupted by gunshots from a sniper.  The couple quickly heads back to the camp, where everyone but Radar and Colonel Blake, who are pinned down in the showers, shelters in the main hospital building. Eventually Radar and the Colonel join the staff in the hospital building and they manage to treat casualties which soon arrive.

Help from headquarters is not immediately forthcoming, and Frank's attempts to be "a real man" (encouraged by Margaret) leads him and Hawkeye to ambush a figure in the mess tent, who turns out to be Radar, desperate for food. It's not until the following day that outside help arrives, in the form of a US army helicopter firing shots at the sniper with the soldier riding shotgun firing on the sniper with a Thompson submachine gun, wounding him. Hawkeye operates on the sniper, and reports to the Swampmen that the sniper was a scared kid who got separated from his unit and targeted the camp in the belief that he was firing on MacArthur's headquarters.

Notes

Frank Burns discusses his medical training with Hawkeye, noting it took him "twice as long" as the usual time to qualify, and that he "flunked out of two med schools".  While this departs from the background of the character of Frank Burns from the novel and the movie, it nonetheless echoes the non-standard medical training of these previous incarnations of the character.

This episode also contains the only instance of onscreen nudity in the television series and one of the first depictions of nudity in prime time TV in the United States-—a brief glimpse of Gary Burghoff's buttocks as Radar's towel slips off as he runs into the shower tent to escape from the sniper fire.

External links

M*A*S*H (season 2) episodes
1973 American television episodes
Television episodes directed by Jackie Cooper